The 2011 World Pool Masters, also known as World Pool Masters XIX, was a nine-ball pool tournament that took place in Quezon City, Philippines, between 3–5 September 2011. It was the 19th edition of the invitational tournament organised by Matchroom Sport.

Germany's Ralf Souquet won the event, defeating Dennis Orcollo in the final 8–5. In winning the event, Ralf Souquet won his sixth World Pool Masters title.

Event prize money

Tournament bracket

References

External links

2011
World Pool Masters
World Pool Masters
World Pool Masters
Sport in Quezon City
September 2011 sports events in the Philippines